Coninae, or as it is more recently (February 2015) represented as a family, Conidae, common names the cone snails, cone shells or cones, is a taxonomic group of small to large predatory sea snails with cone-shaped shells, marine gastropod mollusks in the superfamily Conoidea.

These are sophisticated predatory animals. They hunt and immobilize prey using a modified radular tooth and a venom gland containing neurotoxins; the tooth is launched out of the snail's mouth in a harpoon-like action. With the harpoon being released in less than 250 milliseconds, it is invisible to the human eye.

The traditional taxonomy of cone snails, which prevailed for over 100 years, placed all of the species in the  genus Conus within the family Conidae. In 2009, a proposed taxonomy  by Tucker & Tenorio grouped the cone snails within five families and 115 genera. In 2014, a paper was released (Puillandre, Duda, Meyer, Olivera & Bouchet) that revised the group again, this time in a much simpler way.

2014 taxonomy
In the Journal of Molluscan Studies, in 2014, Puillandre, Duda, Meyer, Olivera & Bouchet presented a new classification for the old genus Conus. Using 329 species, the authors carried out molecular phylogenetic analyses. The results suggested that the authors should place all cone snails in a single family, Conidae, containing four genera: Conus, Conasprella, Profundiconus and Californiconus. The authors group 85% of all known cone snail species under Conus, They recognize 57 subgenera within Conus, and 11 subgenera within the genus Conasprella.

2009 taxonomy

J.K. Tucker and M.J. Tenorio's 2009 proposed a classification scheme for the over 800 cone snail species. They placed the species in 82 genera, and the genera within three families.

History
Prior to 2009, all species within the family conus were placed in one genus, Conus. In 2009 J.K. Tucker and M.J. Tenorio proposed a classification system for the over 600 recognized species that were in the family. Their classification proposed 3 distinct families and 82 genera for the living species of cone snails. This classification was based upon shell morphology, radular differences, anatomy, physiology, cladistics, with comparisons to molecular (DNA) studies. Published accounts of genera within the Conidae that include the various genera include J.K. Tucker & M.J. Tenorio (2009), and Bouchet et al. (2011).

Testing in order to try to understand the molecular phylogeny of the Conidae was initially begun by Christopher Meyer and Alan Kohn, and is continuing, particularly with the advent of nuclear DNA testing in addition to mDNA testing.

As of 2011, some experts still preferred to use the traditional classification, where all species are placed in Conus within the single family Conidae: for example, according to the August 2013 version of the World Register of Marine Species, all species within the family Conidae are in the genus Conus. The binomial names of species in the 82 cone snail genera listed in Tucker & Tenorio 2009 were recognized by the World Register of Marine Species as "alternative representations."

References

External links 
 Gastropods.com info